Miri Shilon  (born 19 June 1954) is an Israeli actress, television personality, journalist, producer and editor.

Biography
Miriam Tzivion (later Miri Shilon) was born and raised in Kfar Shmuel. She travelled to US and met a fellow Israeli television personality and journalist Dan Shilon in New York when Dan Shilon was married and worked as a reporter for the Israel Broadcasting Authority. She was a member of the Defense Ministry's delegation to the US government at that time.

In 2005, Dan Shilon divorced his first wife and married Miri. They have two children; Adi and Dafna. The couple divorced in 2012.

Media career
The couple hosted a television programme together after their marriage. Shilon also acted in a TV series, titled City Tower  in 2001. Her role as Miri Shilon was played by a fellow Israeli actress, Michal Yannai in an Israeli comical musical telenova HaShir Shelanu based on episodes from Shilon's life.

See also
Television in Israel

References

External links
 

1954 births
Living people
Israeli television actresses
Israeli journalists
Israeli television personalities
Israeli people of Romanian-Jewish descent